Lev Markovich Vekker, Russian: Лев Маркович Веккер (4 October 1918, Odessa – 1 October 2001, Virginia, United States) was a Russian and American psychologist.

Vekker was a George Mason University professor of psychology and director/CEO of the Krasnow Institute. His research focused on the problems of objectivity of human cognition. Vekker advanced a general theory of cognitive processes.

Works (in Russian)
 Психика и реальность: единая теория психических процессов (Psyche and reality: a Uniform Theory of Psychical Processes)
 Восприятие и основы его моделирования (Perception and Ways of Its Modeling)

References

External links
 Полная биография - a complete biography (in Russian)
 Lev Vekker Papers

Russian psychologists
20th-century American psychologists
1918 births
2001 deaths
Soviet psychologists
Soviet emigrants to the United States
George Mason University faculty